In pantomime, a principal boy role is the young male protagonist of the play, traditionally played by a young actress in boy's clothes.

The earliest example is Miss Ellington who in 1852 appeared in The Good Woman in the Wood by James Planché to the consternation of a reviewer.  She was followed by other music hall and burlesque entertainers, such as Harriet Vernon described as "a magnificent creature, who was willing to show her ample figure as generously as the conventional tights and trunks of the day allowed" and thus setting the standard of good legs on display and nominally male costume which emphasized her figure.

The tradition grew out of laws restricting the use of child actors in London theatre, and the responsibility carried by such lead roles. A Breeches role was also a rare opportunity for an early 20th-century actress to wear a costume revealing the legs covered only in tights, potentially increasing the size of the audience. The practice of having a female play the principal boy has become less common, as further outlets are sought for the talents of young male popular stars and actors.

Although not written as a pantomime, Peter Pan, or The Boy Who Wouldn't Grow Up is often produced as one with the tradition of a female principal boy continuing.

List of notable principal boys
Maud Boyd
Kate Everleigh
Nellie Farren
Lil Hawthorne
Hy Hazell
Queenie Leighton
Madge Lessing
Marie Loftus
Ouida MacDermott
Nellie Navette
Nellie Stewart
Vesta Tilley
Harriet Vernon
Dorothy Ward

See also
 Cross-gender acting
 Breeches role
 Pantomime dame
 Drag king

References

Pantomime